The 1998–99 Romanian Hockey League season was the 69th season of the Romanian Hockey League, the top league of ice hockey in Romania.

Six teams participated in the league, and Steaua București won the championship.

Regular season

Playoffs

3rd place
Progym Gheorgheni - Sportul Studențesc Bucharest (5-4, 4-6, 4-3, 4-3)

Final
CSA Steaua Bucuresti - SC Miercurea Ciuc (2-1, 2-4, 4-5, 5-3, 5-2)

External links
Season on hockeyarchives.info

Romanian Hockey League seasons
Romanian
Rom